Anthony Henry (born 26 November 1957) is an English association football administrator and former footballer who played in the Football League for Bolton Wanderers, Manchester City, Oldham Athletic, Shrewsbury Town and Stoke City.

Career
Born in Houghton-le-Spring, Henry began his career with Manchester City and made his professional debut against Wolverhampton Wanderers in 1977. As a young player Henry found it difficult to break into a side packed with more established young players such as Gary Owen and also internationals such as Dave Watson and Asa Hartford which had been consistently challenging for major honours. It was not before March 1979 that Henry got an extended run in the side with the team had been struggling in the bottom half of the league table though progress had been made in the UEFA Cup where a 5–2 aggregate third round victory over AC Milan had set up a tie with Borussia Mönchengladbach. Though a 3–1 defeat sent City out of the competition Henry kept his place for the trip to Arsenal four days later and was to miss only one further game until the end of the 1980–81 season, making a total of 15 appearances.

The style of football Malcolm Allison wanted to play suited Henry's ability as a utility player, being able to play across the midfield and also at full-back if need be, and his first goals for Manchester City soon followed as he scored both in a 2–1 League Cup replay win at home to Sheffield Wednesday in early September. Two months later he got his first league goal for the club when he opened the scoring in a 2–0 derby match win over Manchester United, the goal for which he is best-remembered for by the supporters. Three wins out of the last four games saw them finish in seventeenth place, Henry scoring in a 2–1 win on the last day against Ipswich to bring his tally to 4 goals from 32 appearances. Henry lost his place in the team the following season as the poor league form from the previous term continued, Malcolm Allison was sacked and replaced by John Bond. He immediately brought in a number of experienced players, with Henry losing his place in the team. In the League Cup he had hit a rich vein of form, helping the side reach the semi-final only to be defeated by Liverpool. Henry played as a substitute in the 1981 FA Cup Final.

Henry was sold to Bolton Wanderers in 1981 for a fee of £120,000. He spent two seasons at Burnden Park scoring 20 goals in 70 matches for the "Trotters". He then went on to Oldham Athletic where he enjoyed what was the most successful time of his career making almost 200 appearances for the "Latics". In December 1987 Henry signed for Stoke City and instantly established himself in Mick Mills' first team playing in every match until the end of the 1987–88 season. He was again a regular in 1988–89 playing in 48 games as Stoke finished in a disappointing 13th. At the end of the season Henry decided to move to Japan to play for Mazda before ending his career with Shrewsbury Town and then Welsh League side TNS Llansantffraid.  During his spell with the club he was also manager, and was sacked by the club's chairman wearing a towel after a match.

Scouting
After his retirement from football, Henry continued to work within the game as a scout. He was chief scout at Chelsea, Sunderland and then Everton, before taking up the role of director of player recruitment at West Ham United in 2014.

On 1 February 2018, Henry was suspended from his role at West Ham following a report in the Daily Mail. The report alleged that he had told agents that the club did not want to sign any more African players as they "cause mayhem" when they don't play, citing the recently departed Diafra Sakho as an example. A club statement confirmed the suspension "pending a full and thorough investigation". The following day, the club announced that his contract had been terminated. In July 2018, Henry was banned from football for 12 months by the Football Association after admitting misconduct.

Career statistics
Source:

A.  The "Other" column constitutes appearances and goals in the Anglo-Scottish Cup, Football League play-offs Football League Trophy and Full Members Cup.

References

External links
 

1957 births
Living people
People from Houghton-le-Spring
Footballers from Tyne and Wear
English footballers
Manchester City F.C. players
Bolton Wanderers F.C. players
Oldham Athletic A.F.C. players
Stoke City F.C. players
Sanfrecce Hiroshima players
Shrewsbury Town F.C. players
Witton Albion F.C. players
The New Saints F.C. players
English Football League players
Chelsea F.C. non-playing staff
Sunderland A.F.C. non-playing staff
Everton F.C. non-playing staff
West Ham United F.C. non-playing staff
Association football controversies
English expatriate footballers
Expatriate footballers in Japan
Association football midfielders
English expatriate sportspeople in Japan
FA Cup Final players
The New Saints F.C. managers
English football managers
Cymru Premier managers